Driss Himmes (born September 30, 1983 in Tarascon) is a French professional football player who currently plays for Olympique Alès.

External links
 Driss Himmes profile at foot-national.com
 

1983 births
Living people
People from Tarascon
French footballers
Ligue 2 players
Stade Beaucairois players
AC Arlésien players
FC Martigues players
SO Cassis Carnoux players
Olympique Alès players
Association football midfielders
Sportspeople from Bouches-du-Rhône
Footballers from Provence-Alpes-Côte d'Azur